Kory Karlander (born March 21, 1972) is a Canadian former professional ice hockey player who most notably played for the Kalamazoo Wings in the ECHL.

In his 17th season as a professional hockey player, at the age of 39, Karlander was named to the (2010–11) ECHL First All-Star Team.

References

External links

1972 births
Living people
Belfast Giants players
Canadian ice hockey centres
Columbus Chill players
Detroit Vipers players
Grand Rapids Griffins players
Grand Rapids Griffins (IHL) players
Ice hockey people from Manitoba
Jackson Bandits players
Louisville RiverFrogs players
Kalamazoo Wings (1974–2000) players
Kalamazoo Wings (ECHL) players
Kalamazoo Wings (UHL) players
Milwaukee Admirals (IHL) players
Muskegon Fury players
Odessa Jackalopes players
Northern Michigan Wildcats men's ice hockey players
Peoria Rivermen (ECHL) players
Raleigh IceCaps players
Buffalo Wings (inline hockey) players
Los Angeles Blades players
Canadian expatriate ice hockey players in Northern Ireland
Canadian expatriate ice hockey players in the United States